Endotricha rosina is a species of snout moth in the genus Endotricha. It was described by Jean Ghesquière in 1942, and is known from the Democratic Republic of the Congo.

References

Moths described in 1942
Endotrichini
Insects of the Democratic Republic of the Congo
Moths of Africa
Endemic fauna of the Democratic Republic of the Congo